Sir Thomas Mackenzie (1853–1930) was Prime Minister of New Zealand in 1912, and later High Commissioner.

Thomas Mackenzie may also refer to:
Thomas MacKenzie (Russian admiral) (1740–1786), rear admiral, founder of Sevastopol
Thomas Mackenzie (Royal Navy officer) (1753–1813), Royal Navy admiral
Thomas Mackenzie (Scottish politician) (1793–1856), MP for Ross and Cromarty, 1837–1847
Thomas Mackenzie, Lord Mackenzie (1807–1869), Scottish judge
Thomas Mackenzie (Australian politician) (1854–1934), member of the New South Wales Legislative Assembly
Thomas Mackenzie (illustrator) (1887–1944), illustrator
Tom MacKenzie (1882–1927), Australian rules footballer
Thomas Mackenzie (1789–1822), Member of parliament for Ross-shire, 1818–1822

See also
 Tam McKenzie (1922–1967), Scottish footballer for Hearts
 Thomasin McKenzie (born 2000), New Zealand actress
 Thomas McKenzie, American indoor footballer
 Thomas McKenzie (footballer), Scottish footballer for Third Lanark and Plymouth Argyle 
 Tommy McKenzie (1906–1990), Scottish footballer for Motherwell